Patania expictalis is a moth in the family Crambidae. It was described by Hugo Theodor Christoph in 1881. It is found in the Russian Far East (Amur), China and Japan.

References

Moths described in 1881
Moths of Asia
Moths of Japan
Spilomelinae